Niphoparmena fuscomaculata is a species of beetle in the family Cerambycidae. It was described by Villiers in 1940.

References

fuscomaculata
Beetles described in 1940